Shuklapuri or Shukul Puri is a village and gram panchayat in Barhalganj, Gorakhpur district, Uttar Pradesh, India. It has a post office with pin code 273402.

Geography 

This village is 6 km (3.7 mi) from Barahalganj between Barahalganj and Gola Bajar on Ram Janki Marg (State Highway 72).

Post Office-Shuklapuri, Gram Panchayat-Shuklapuri

Thana-Barahalganj, Tehseel-Gola Bajar

Tappa-Haveli, Pargana-Chillupar

District-Gorakhpur, State-Uttar Pradesh

Country-India, Pincode: 273402

Geographical facts
Coordinates-26° 18′ 24″ N, 83° 26′ 58″ E

 Directly connected to every neighbour village by road because Shuklapuri has three roads and two gates.
 One temple of Kali Maa and Lord Shiva, one Deeh Baba, one Aughad baba, one temple of Shani Dev
 Four ponds in four direction  and eight wells presently in village and surrounded by three gardens.

History 
 In British Raj the King & Queen of Naraharpur State came in village after their dismissal from Naraharpur by British Army and lived here for 2 days after that they went to Nepal but before going to Nepal they hide some of their arms in Shuklapuri.
 In this village there is a 500-year-old Baniyan tree.
 There are two wells which are more than 1000 years old.
 In Shuklapuri there is a post office which is more than 100 years old and it is one of two post offices of British Raj in Gorakhpur District.

Demography 
There are four castes in village:
 Brahmin (Shukla)
 Yadav
 Maurya (Koiri)
 Kamhar

References 

Villages in Gorakhpur district